The 2011 MLS season was the fifth season in Toronto FC's existence. The club once again failed to make the playoffs, however, they won the Canadian Championship and strong performances near the end of the season helped them in qualifying to the semifinal phase of the 2011–12 CONCACAF Champions League.

The first league game was played on March 19, 2011, against Vancouver Whitecaps FC. It was the first match between two Canadian clubs in Major League Soccer history. Dwayne De Rosario scored the 8,000th goal in league history in a match against the Vancouver Whitecaps. The first home match was March 26, 2011, versus the other 2011 expansion club, Portland Timbers. The regular season ended on October 22, 2011.

Across all competitions, Toronto FC finished 2011 with a record of 14-15-17, for 59 points from 46 matches.

Club

Management team

Squad

Squad list
As of October 22, 2011.

Squad information

Player movement

Transfers

In

Out

Loans

In

Competitions

Pre-season

MLS regular season

Results summary

Results by round

Match results

Canadian Championship

Note

CONCACAF Champions League 

Note

MLS Reserve League

Squad statistics

Appearances and goals

* = Player is no longer with team

Top scorers
{| class="wikitable" style="font-size: 95%; text-align: center;"
|-
!width=80|Rank
!width=80|Number
!width=150|Name
!width=110|Total
!width=110|MLS
!width=110|Canadian Championship
!width=110|Champions League
|-
|1 
|14
|align=left| Danny Koevermans
|10
|8
|0
|2
|-
|2
|~
|align=left| Maicon Santos*
|9
|6
|3
|0
|-
|3
|7
|align=left| Joao Plata
|8
|3
|1
|4
|-
|rowspan="2"|4
|~
|align=left| Alan Gordon*
|6
|4
|2
|0
|-
|9
|align=left| Ryan Johnson
|6
|3
|0
|3
|-
|rowspan="3"|6 
|18
|align=left| Nick Soolsma
|3
|3
|0
|0
|-
|6
|align=left| Julian de Guzman
|3
|2
|0
|1
|-
|70
|align=left| Peri Marošević
|3
|2
|0
|1
|-
|9 
|33
|align=left| Javier Martina
|2
|2
|0
|0
|-
|rowspan="4"|10 
|8
|align=left| Eric Avila
|1
|1
|0
|0
|-
|~
|align=left| Dwayne De Rosario*
|1
|1
|0
|0
|-
|~
|align=left| Tony Tchani*
|1
|1
|0
|0
|-
|19
|align=left| Mikael Yourassowsky
|1
|0
|1
|0
|-

* = Player is no longer with team

Disciplinary record 
Only players with at least one card included.

* = Player is no longer with team

Recognition

MLS Player of the Week

MLS Goal of the Week

MLS Save of the Week

MLS Team of the Week

Miscellany

Allocation ranking 
Toronto is in the #3 position in the MLS Allocation Ranking. The allocation ranking is the mechanism used to determine which MLS club has first priority to acquire a U.S. National Team player who signs with MLS after playing abroad, or a former MLS player who returns to the league after having gone to a club abroad for a transfer fee. A ranking can be traded, provided that part of the compensation received in return is another club's ranking.

International roster spots 
It is believed that Toronto FC has 9 international roster spots. Each club in Major League Soccer is allocated 8 international roster spots, which can be traded. Toronto FC acquired an additional spot from San Jose Earthquakes on July 14, 2008. Toronto maintains this roster spot through the end of the 2013 season, at which point it reverts to San Jose. Toronto FC acquired another international roster spot from San Jose on July 14, 2011. TFC has use of this spot through the end of the 2012 season, at which point it reverts to San Jose. Toronto also traded a spot to FC Dallas on August 2, 2011, for the remainder of the 2011 season only.

There is no limit on the number of international slots on each club's roster. The remaining roster slots must belong to domestic players. For clubs based in Canada, a domestic player is either a player with the legal right to work in Canada (i.e., Canadian citizen, permanent resident, part of a protected class) or a U.S. citizen, a permanent U.S. resident (green card holder) or the holder of other special U.S. status (e.g., refugee or asylum status).

Future draft pick trades 
Future picks acquired: 2012 SuperDraft Round 1 pick acquired from New York Red Bulls; 2012 SuperDraft Round 3 pick acquired from Colorado Rapids; 2013 Supplemental Draft Round 3 pick acquired from Colorado Rapids. Toronto also acquired undisclosed future considerations from Los Angeles Galaxy which may or may not include draft pick(s).
Future picks traded: 2012 SuperDraft Round 2 pick traded to Chicago Fire. Toronto has also traded future considerations to Vancouver Whitecaps which may or may not include draft pick(s).

References

Toronto FC seasons
Toronto
Toronto